Kufayrat Abu Khinan  is a town in the Madaba Governorate of north-western Jordan.

It lies several miles north of Madaba.

References

Populated places in Madaba Governorate